Heteroconger cobra, sometimes known as the cobra garden eel, is a species of garden eel of the family Congridae, found in the western Central Pacific from Honiara, the Solomon Islands to Port Moresby, Papua New Guinea.

They occur in colonies, on sloping sand bottoms. They are known to be very frightened of humans. When they are spotted, these eels dart back into the holes in which they live.

References

 

cobra
Fish described in 1981
Taxa named by James Erwin Böhlke
Taxa named by John Ernest Randall